Girls Trip is a 2017 American comedy film starring Regina Hall, Queen Latifah, Tiffany Haddish, and Jada Pinkett Smith. The film is directed by Malcolm D. Lee and written by Kenya Barris and Tracy Oliver, from a story by the pair and Erica Rivinoja, who based the script off their own experiences with their female friends. Along with Lee, the film was produced by Will Packer under his Will Packer Productions banner. It follows a group of four friends who go to New Orleans to attend the Essence Music Festival in order to reconnect after a long time.

The cast was announced in June 2016, with principal photography taking place that month in New Orleans, Louisiana. The film also filmed during the 2016 Essence Music Festival, casting over 5000 background actors.

Girls Trip premiered at the American Black Film Festival in Miami on June 14, 2017 and was theatrically released in the United States by Universal Pictures on July 21, 2017. It received overwhelmingly positive reviews from critics, with many praising the cast performances and the film's originality. It was chosen by Time magazine as one of its top ten films of 2017. It was also a massive commercial success, grossing $140 million worldwide on its $19 million production budget including over $100 million domestically, the first comedy of 2017 to do so. It was also the first time a film written by an African-American female screenwriter had crossed the $100 million mark at the box office.

The film received multiple awards and nominations from various award and critic organizations, including Outstanding Motion Picture and Outstanding Supporting Actress in a Motion Picture for Haddish at the 49th NAACP Image Awards. It received seven nominations at the 18th Black Reel Awards, with Haddish winning two awards for her performance.

Plot
In an attempt to reconnect with her friends from college, lifestyle guru Ryan Pierce, dubbed "the next Oprah," decides to invite her friends on a girls' trip to Essence Music Festival in New Orleans, where she will be the keynote speaker. Known as the "Flossy Posse," the group includes Sasha, a former journalist from Time magazine who now owns a floundering gossip site and is struggling financially; Lisa, a nurse and uptight single mother who has not had a boyfriend since her divorce years earlier; and Dina, a happy-go-lucky, impulsive party animal who was fired from her job after harming a co-worker who accidentally ate her lunch.

Shortly after arriving, Sasha receives a photo of Ryan's husband Stewart kissing another woman. The friends are reluctant to tell Ryan initially, but Ryan admits she is already aware of the situation and informs her friends that the two are in couple's therapy to address Stewart's infidelity. After Dina confronts Stewart at their hotel with a broken bottle, the Flossy Posse are ejected and settles into a one-star motel instead. At the Essence Fest later that night, they run into an old friend Julian, a musician performing at the festival who Ryan flirts with.  He later gives up his hotel suite so that the women have somewhere decent to stay.

The next day, Ryan and Stewart host a cooking demonstration together at the music festival that goes awry when Stewart's mistress, Simone, shows up. A potential investor is impressed, however, and a business meeting is set up for Ryan and Stewart with their agent, Elizabeth, who then introduces Ryan and Stewart to Bethany Marshall. Dina serves the women absinthe right before the meeting, causing them to hallucinate. At her meeting, Ryan thinks the waitress is Stewart's mistress; Lisa thinks her kids are at the club with her; Dina thinks she is flying; and Sasha thinks she is making out with an attractive man who is actually a lamp. The girls eventually pull Ryan out of the meeting and decide to go to a club to dance the absinthe off. They run into Simone and her friends and engage in a dance off before getting in a bar fight.  Julian picks them up before they can get arrested and takes them back to their hotel.

Ryan and Stewart are offered a massive deal from the chain store Best Mart, whose representative wants to hire them as spokespeople. Ryan goes out to celebrate with the girls at one of Julian's shows. Simone shows up and tells Sasha that she is pregnant. She offers to give Sasha's blog exclusive content to her affair with pictures as well. Stewart once again goes to Ryan to convince her to stay with him to finalize their deal. Simone goes public with the affair, and Ryan accuses Sasha of being the one who leaked the pictures. The fight spills out into the relationship of all the women and they all part on bad terms.

Dina and Lisa make up quickly. After Sasha decides to take down her blog, disgusted with the celebrity gossip racket, Dina and Lisa reunite with her.  As Ryan begins to give her keynote speech on the last day of the music festival and denies that the picture of Stewart and Simone is real, she sees her friends walk into the room.  Ryan breaks from her scripted remarks, admitting the picture and affair are real. The speech is a success and when the women reunite after the show, Ryan apologizes to Sasha. Ryan's agent arrives and tells Ryan that the deal with Best Mart is still on but with her alone. Ryan decides to take Sasha as her business partner the way they planned to be years ago. A series of events shows the girls happily reunited and Ryan beginning a relationship with Julian.

Cast

 Regina Hall as Ryan Pierce, a bestselling author 
 Queen Latifah as Sasha Franklin, an Internet gossip reporter
 Jada Pinkett Smith as Lisa Miller Cooper, a nurse and mom
 Tiffany Haddish as Dina, their loud happy-go-lucky friend 
 Larenz Tate as Julian Stevens, a musician
 Mike Colter  as Stewart Pierce, Ryan's cheating husband
 Kate Walsh as Elizabeth Davelli, a business agent 
 Kofi Siriboe as Malik, a young stud
 Deborah Ayorinde as Simone, Stewart's girlfriend
 Lara Grice as Bethany, an advertiser
 Tonea Stewart as Aunt Marian
 Mike Epps as an absinthe seller
 Shrey Vyapari as Vikram, Dina's Co-Worker
 Aadyn Encalarde as Riley, Lisa's Daughter

Amongst the cast, multiple celebrities and musicians make cameos, most notably Diddy, Ne-Yo, Mariah Carey, and New Edition (who perform "If It Isn't Love").

Production
In February 2014, Universal announced that director Malcolm D. Lee and producer Will Packer would collaborate on a film tentatively titled Girls Trip, with South Park writer Erica Rivinoja attached to script. In May 2016, Universal set a release date of August 11, 2017 for the film. It was also reported that Regina Hall would star, and Kenya Barris and Tracy Oliver were rewriting the script. Oliver told The Hollywood Reporter that she wanted to break down the barriers of respectability politics and portray "Black women being carefree and having fun just like everybody else. I think we need to show all aspects of black lives. I love Moonlight, I love Hidden Figures, but I also want to see some people who are having fun and just showing female friends hanging out." Queen Latifah and Jada Pinkett Smith joined the cast in early June 2016, and Larenz Tate joined later that month. The film's release date was changed to July 21, 2017, as principal photography began in late June 2016 in New Orleans, and included filming at the 2016 Essence Music Festival.

A teaser trailer for the film was released on January 31, 2017. A red band trailer for the film was released on February 9, 2017.

The film was awarded The ReFrame Stamp for gender parity in its production.

Soundtrack

Credits adapted from Tidal.

Track listing

Reception

Box office
Girls Trip grossed $115.2 million in the United States and Canada and $24.9 million in other territories for a total gross of $140.9 million, against a net production budget of $20–28 million. Deadline Hollywood calculated the film made a net profit of $66.1 million, when factoring together all expenses and revenues.

Girls Trip opened alongside Dunkirk and Valerian and the City of a Thousand Planets on July 21, 2017, and was projected to gross around $20 million from 2,583 theaters, with industry experts saying it could debut as high as $30 million. It made $11.7 million on its first day, including $1.7 million from Thursday night previews at 2,195 theaters. The film grossed $31.2 million in its opening weekend, finishing second at the box office behind Dunkirk and marked the largest opening of director Malcolm D. Lee's career; 52% of its opening weekend audience was African-American, with an overall 60% being women over 25. In its second week the film dropped just 37% and grossed $19.6 million, finishing 3rd at the box office behind Dunkirk and newcomer The Emoji Movie, and in its third week the film made $11.4 million, finishing 4th. On August 17, the film crossed the $100 million mark domestically, becoming the first comedy of 2017 to do so.

Critical response
On Rotten Tomatoes, the film holds an approval rating of 92% based on 177 reviews, with an average rating of 6.9/10. The site's critics consensus reads: "Girls Trip is the rare R-rated comedy that pushes boundaries to truly comedic effect—and anchors its laughs in compelling characters brought to life by a brilliantly assembled cast." On Metacritic, the film has a score of 71 out of 100, based on 35 critics, indicating "generally favorable reviews". Audiences polled by CinemaScore gave the film an average grade of "A+" on an A+ to F scale, and PostTrak reported filmgoers gave it an 82% overall positive score, with 67% saying they would definitely recommend it.

For Variety, Peter Debruge wrote "When it comes to Hollywood studio comedies, most of the time, we are lucky to get one unforgettable set piece, whereas Girls Trip screenwriters Kenya Barris and Tracy Oliver deliver at least half a dozen. And rather than simply letting an effective joke stand, they double down, milking it for all it's worth." For CinemaBlend, Mike Reyes wrote "While there's still plenty of time worn clichés in Girls Trip, there is a genuine sense of friendship, and comedy throughout, that make the film one of this summer's most surprising comedies. You can believe that these four women are the best of friends, which is something that's not always easy or focused on in a comedy of this type. Girls Trip has an energy that's undeniable, eventually winning audience members over with a theme of friendship that's well built in the context of the film."

Awards

Potential sequel
In January 2019, Pinkett-Smith discussed a potential sequel to Girls Trip, stating "I'm ready for more Flossy Posse, trust me. I'm ready to have some fun with my girls!", and giving Rio de Janeiro or South Africa as potential locations for the film. In April 2019 Latifah confirmed that a sequel was "definitely happening," but Haddish stated just days later that talks had stalled.

In March 2020, Haddish confirmed Tracy Oliver had a treatment "ready to go", and would begin working on the script. Haddish added "We might decide not to even make it Girls Trip, maybe we'll do a different story just in case no one wants to make Girls Trip 2". In January 2023, Oliver said that the sequel was "officially happening", and confirmed that the main cast would be returning. She also named the AfroFuture festival in Accra, Ghana as a possible setting, pending the finalization of the script.

See also
 List of black films of the 2010s
 Rough Night, another road trip comedy film with a premise and predominantly female cast similar to Girls Trip.

References

External links
 
 
 
 

2017 films
2017 comedy films
2010s buddy comedy films
2010s English-language films
2010s female buddy films
Adultery in films
African-American comedy films
American buddy comedy films
American female buddy films
African-American films
Films directed by Malcolm D. Lee
Films produced by Will Packer
Films scored by David Newman
Films set in New Orleans
Films shot in New Orleans
Films with screenplays by Kenya Barris
Perfect World Pictures films
Universal Pictures films
Will Packer Productions films
2010s American films